Lynn Helen Sing (born 29 October 1961) is a South African former cricketer who played as a right-handed batter. She appeared in one One Day International for South Africa in 1997, against Ireland.

References

External links
 
 

1961 births
Living people
Cricketers from Durban
South African women cricketers
South Africa women One Day International cricketers